The 2011–12 season for association football was Panionios' 51st season in Super League Greece.

They also competed in the Greek Cup.

Season
As of January 2012

Probable starting line-up 
<div style="position: relative;">

Transfers

In

Out

Matches

Super League

First round

Second round

Greek Cup

Top goalscorers
 10 goals
  Njazi Kuqi (10 in Greek League)

 9 goals
  Sakis Theodoropoulos (9 in Greek League)

 5 goals
  André Schembri (4 in Greek League, 1 in Greek Cup)

 2 goals
  Fanouris Goundoulakis (2 in Greek League)
  Patrick Dimbala (2 in Greek League)

 1 goal
  Sito Riera (1 in Greek League)
  Bennard Kumordzi (1 Greek League)
  Fabián Estoyanoff (1 in Greek League)
  Dimitris Kolovos (1 in Greek League)
  Jean-Jacques Pierre (1 Greek League)
  Vitorino Antunes (1 in Greek League)
  Amiri Kurdi (1 in Greek League)
  Suleiman Omo (1 in Greek League)
  Dimitris Siovas (1 in Greek Cup)
  Edin Cocalić (1 in Greek Cup)

Panionios F.C. seasons
Panionios